The 1998 Atlantic hurricane season was an event in the annual tropical cyclone season in the north Atlantic Ocean. This Atlantic hurricane season saw an above-average number of named tropical storms, and included a single-day record for number of hurricanes simultaneously in progress, with four active on September 25: Georges, Ivan, Jeanne and Karl. The season officially began on June 1, 1998 and ended on November 30, 1998. These dates, adopted by convention, historically describe the period in each year when most tropical systems form. Even so, this season's first storm, Tropical Storm Alex, did not form until July 27, while its last, Hurricane Nicole, dissipated on December 1.

Altogether, 14 tropical storms formed during the season, including 10 hurricanes of which three intensified into major hurricanes. Ten of these storms formed during a five week period at the height of the season, August 19 – September 23. The two most significant storms of the season, in terms of loss of life and damage, were hurricanes Georges and Mitch. Georges moved from the Caribbean Sea to the Gulf of Mexico and ultimately to the United States Gulf Coast, resulting extensive damage and a large number of fatalities, especially in Haiti and the Dominican Republic. Mitch formed over the southwestern Caribbean Sea and then moved slowly over Central America, causing catastrophic flooding and leaving more than 11,000 people dead, making it the second deadliest Atlantic hurricane in history after the Great Hurricane of 1780. Following the 1998 season, the names Georges and Mitch were retired from reuse in the North Atlantic by the World Meteorological Organization.

This timeline documents tropical cyclone formations, strengthening, weakening, landfalls, extratropical transitions, and dissipations during the season. It includes information that was not released throughout the season, meaning that data from post-storm reviews by the National Hurricane Center, such as a storm that was not initially warned upon, has been included.

By convention, meteorologists use one time zone when issuing forecasts and making observations: Coordinated Universal Time (UTC), and also use the 24-hour clock (where 00:00 = midnight UTC). In this time line, all information is listed by UTC first with the respective local time included in parentheses.

Timeline

June

June 1
 The 1998 Atlantic hurricane season officially begins.

July

July 27
12:00 UTC (8:00 a.m.

July 29
00:00 UTC (8:00 p.m. AST, July 28)Tropical Depression One strengthens and becomes Tropical Storm Alex.

July 31
 00:00 UTC (8:00 p.m.

August

August 2
18:00 UTC (2:00 p.m. AST)Tropical Storm Alex weakens to a tropical depression and later dissipates northeast of Saint Martin.

August 19
12:00 UTC (8:00 a.m. AST)Tropical Depression Two develops from a tropical wave while located several hundred miles east of the Leeward Islands.

August 20
12:00 UTC (8:00 a.m.

August 21
06:00 UTC (1:00 a.m. CDT)Tropical Depression Three develops in the Gulf of Mexico about 315 miles (505 km) southeast of the south Texas coast.
18:00 UTC (1:00 p.m.

August 22
00:00 UTC (8:00 p.m. AST, August 21)Tropical Storm Bonnie attains Category 1 hurricane strength about 240 mi (385 km) east of Turks Island.
06:00 UTC (1:00 a.m.
10:00 UTC (5:00 a.m. CDT)Tropical Storm Charley makes landfall near Port Aransas, Texas with winds of 45 mph (70 km/h).
18:00 UTC (2:00 p.m. EDT)Hurricane Bonnie strengthens to a Category 2 hurricane north-northeast of Turk Island.
15:00 UTC (10:00 a.m.

August 23
12:00 UTC (8:00 a.m.

August 24
00:00 UTC (8:00 p.m.
06:00 UTC (2:00 a.m.
18:00 UTC (2:00 p.m. AST)Tropical Depression Four strengthens east of the Lesser Antilles and becomes Tropical Storm Danielle.

August 25
12:00 UTC (8:00 a.m. AST)Tropical Storm Danielle strengthens to a Category 1 hurricane.

August 26
06:00 UTC (2:00 a.m.
18:00 UTC (2:00 p.m. AST)Hurricane Danielle weakens to a Category 1 hurricane.

August 27
00:00 UTC (8:00 p.m. EDT, August 26)Hurricane Bonnie weakens to a Category 2 hurricane.
04:00 UTC (12:00 a.m. EDT)Hurricane Bonnie makes landfall near Wilmington, North Carolina with winds of 110 mph (175 km/h).
06:00 UTC (2:00 a.m. AST)Hurricane Danielle restrengthens to a Category 2 hurricane.
12:00 UTC (2:00 a.m. AST)Hurricane Danielle again attains its maximum sustained winds of 105 mph (165 km/h).
12:00 UTC (8 a.m. EDT)Hurricane Bonnie weakens to a Category 1 hurricane over land near New Bern, North Carolina.
17:00 UTC (1 p.m.

August 28
00:00 UTC (8:00 p.m. EDT, August 27)Tropical Storm Bonnie restrengthens to a Category 1 hurricane as it moves off the coast and over the Outer Banks near Manteo, North Carolina.
00:00 UTC (8:00 p.m. EDT, August 27)Hurricane Danielle weakens to a Category 1 hurricane while well to the north of the Leeward Islands.
18:00 UTC (2:00 p.m.

August 30
18:00 UTC (2:00 p.m. AST)Tropical Storm Bonnie transitions into an extratropical cyclone south-southeast of Cape Race, Newfoundland and is subsequently absorbed by a front.

August 31
12:00 UTC (8:00 a.m. AST)Hurricane Danielle restrengthens to a Category 2 hurricane and simultaneously attains its maximum sustained wind speed of 105 mph (165 km/h) while northeast of Great Abaco Island, Bahamas.
12:00 UTC (7:00 a.m. CDT)Tropical Depression Five develops from a tropical wave in the Gulf of Mexico roughly halfway between Mérida, Yucatán and Tampico, Tamaulipas.
18:00 UTC (1:00 p.m.

September

September 2

06:00 UTC (2:00 a.m. AST)Hurricane Danielle weakens to a Category 1 hurricane.
12:00 UTC (7:00 a.m.
18:00 UTC (1:00 p.m. CDT)Hurricane Earl strengthens into a Category 2 hurricane and simultaneously attains its maximum sustained wind speed of 100 mph (155 km/h).

September 3
00:00 UTC (7:00 p.m.
06:00 UTC (1:00 a.m. CDT)Hurricane Earl makes landfall near Panama City, Florida with winds of 80 mph (130 km/h).
06:00 UTC (2:00 a.m.
12:00 UTC (7:00 a.m.
18:00 UTC (1:00 p.m. CDT)Tropical Storm Earl transitions into an extratropical cyclone over central Georgia, and subsequently, after moving northeastward away from the U.S. southeast coast and then crossing over Newfoundland, is absorbed by the extratropical cyclone that was Hurricane Danielle.

September 4
00:00 UTC (8:00 p.m. AST, September 3)Hurricane Danielle transitions into an extratropical cyclone while centered 230 miles (370 km) south of Cape Race, Newfoundland and subsequently merges with another extratropical low.

September 8
18:00 UTC (1:00 p.m.

September 9
18:00 UTC (1:00 p.m. CDT)Tropical Depression Six strengthens and becomes Tropical Storm Frances.

September 11
00:00 UTC (7:00 p.m. CDT, September 10)Tropical Storm Frances attains its maximum sustained wind speed of 65 mph (100 km/h).
06:00 UTC (1:00 a.m.

September 12
00:00 UTC (7:00 p.m.

September 13
18:00 UTC (1:00 p.m. CDT)Tropical Depression Frances degenerates into a remnant low pressure center over North Texas.

September 15
12:00 UTC (8:00 a.m.

September 16
12:00 UTC (8:00 a.m.

September 17
12:00 UTC (7:00 a.m. CDT)Tropical Depression Eight develops from a tropical wave while located in the north-central Gulf of Mexico.
18:00 UTC (2:00 p.m. AST)Tropical Storm Georges strengthens into a Category 1 hurricane east of the Lesser Antilles.

September 18
12:00 UTC (8:00 a.m. AST)Hurricane Georges strengthens into a Category 2 hurricane.

September 19
00:00 UTC (8:00 p.m.
12:00 UTC (8:00 a.m.
12:00 UTC (7:00 a.m. CDT)Tropical Depression Eight strengthens into Tropical Storm Hermine.
18:00 UTC (2:00 p.m. AST)Hurricane Georges strengthens into a Category 4 hurricane.

September 20
00:00 UTC (7:00 p.m.
05:00 UTC (12:00 a.m. CDT)Tropical Storm Hermine makes landfall near Cocodrie, Louisiana with winds of 40 mph (65 km/h).
06:00 UTC (2:00 a.m.
12:00 UTC (7:00 a.m.
18:00 UTC (2:00 p.m. AST)Tropical Depression Nine strengthens into Tropical Storm Ivan west of the Cape Verde Islands.
18:00 UTC (1:00 p.m. CDT)Tropical Depression Hermine dissipates over southeastern Mississippi.

September 21
00:00 UTC (8:00 p.m.
04:00 UTC (12:00 a.m. AST)Hurricane Georges makes landfall near Falmouth, Antigua with winds of 115 mph (185 km/h).
06:00 UTC (2:00 p.m.
08:00 UTC (4:00 a.m. AST)Hurricane Georges makes landfall near Basseterre, St. Kitts with winds of 115 mph (185 km/h).
18:00 UTC (2:00 p.m. AST)Tropical Depression Ten strengthens into Tropical Storm Jeanne.
22:00 UTC (6:00 p.m. AST)Hurricane Georges makes landfall near Fajardo, Puerto Rico with winds of 115 mph (185 km/h).

September 22
05:00 UTC (1:00 a.m.
12:30 UTC (8:30 a.m.
18:00 UTC (2:00 p.m. AST) Hurricane Georges weakens to a Category 2 hurricane over land just north of Santo Domingo.
18:00 UTC (2:00 p.m.

September 23
09:00 UTC (5:00 a.m. EDT)Hurricane Georges emerges over the waters of the Windward Passage west of Gonaïves, Haiti as a Category 1 hurricane.
12:00 UTC (8:00 a.m.
18:00 UTC (2:00 p.m. AST)Tropical Storm Ivan strengthens into a Category 1 hurricane southwest of the Azores.
18:00 UTC (2:00 p.m. AST)Hurricane Jeanne strengthens into a Category 2 hurricane west of the Cape Verde Islands..
21:30 UTC (5:30 p.m.

September 24
00:00 UTC (8:00 p.m. AST, September 23)Tropical Depression Eleven strengthens into Tropical Storm Karl northeast of Bermuda.
18:00 UTC (2:00 p.m. EDT)Hurricane Georges emerges into the Straits of Florida near Cayo Coco along the north coast of Cuba as a Category 1 hurricane.
18:00 UTC (2:00 p.m.

September 25
06:00 UTC (2:00 a.m. EDT)Hurricane Georges restrengthens to a Category 2 hurricane southeast of Key West, Florida.
12:00 UTC (2:00 p.m. AST)Tropical Storm Karl strengthens into a Category 1 hurricane west-southwest of the Azores.
15:30 UTC (11:30 a.m. EDT)Hurricane Georges makes landfall on Key West with winds of 105 mph (165 km/h).
18:00 UTC (2:00 p.m. AST)Hurricane Jeanne weakens to a Category 1 hurricane west of the Cape Verde Islands.

September 26
06:00 UTC (2:00 a.m.

September 27
00:00 UTC (8:00 p.m. AST, September 26)Hurricane Ivan weakens to a tropical storm northwest of Lajes, Azores Islands.
00:00 UTC (8:00 p.m.
06:00 UTC (2:00 a.m. AST)Tropical Storm Ivan transitions into an extratropical cyclone north of the Azores.
12:00 UTC (2:00 p.m. AST)Hurricane Karl weakens to a Category 1 hurricane west of the Azores.

September 28
00:00 UTC (8:00 p.m.
06:00 UTC (2 a.m. AST)Tropical Storm Karl transitions into an extratropical cyclone.
11:30 UTC (6:30 a.m. CDT)Hurricane Georges makes landfall in Biloxi, Mississippi with winds of 105 mph (165 km/h).
18:00 UTC (1 p.m. CDT)Hurricane Georges weakens to a Category 1 hurricane just north of Biloxi.

September 29
00:00 UTC (7:00 p.m.
12:00 UTC (7:00 a.m.
18:00 UTC (2:00 p.m. AST)Hurricane Jeanne weakens to a tropical storm west-southwest of the Azores.

September 30
21:00 UTC (5:00 p.m.

October

October 1
0600 UTC (2:00 a.m. AST)Tropical Depression Jeanne transitions into an extratropical cyclone east of the Central Azores and subsequently dissipates.
12:00 UTC (8:00 a.m. EDT)Tropical Depression Georges dissipates over the Atlantic coast near Jacksonville, Florida.

October 5
00:00 UTC (8:00 p.m. AST, October 4)Tropical Depression Twelve develops from a tropical wave while located about halfway between Cape Verde and the Lesser Antilles.
06:00 UTC (2:00 a.m. AST)Tropical Depression Twelve strengthens into Tropical Storm Lisa.

October 9
12:00 UTC (8:00 a.m.
21:00 UTC (5:00 p.m.

October 22
00:00 UTC (8:00 p.m. EDT, October 21)Tropical Depression Thirteen develops from a tropical wave while located about 415 miles (660 km) south of Kingston, Jamaica.
18:00 UTC (2:00 p.m. EDT)Tropical Depression Thirteen strengthens and becomes Tropical Storm Mitch about 260 miles (420 km) east-southeast of San Andrés Island, Colombia.

October 24
06:00 UTC (2:00 a.m. EDT)Tropical Storm Mitch strengthens into a Category 1 hurricane about 295 miles (475 km) south-southwest of Kingston, Jamaica.
18:00 UTC (2:00 p.m. EDT)Hurricane Mitch strengthens into a Category 2 hurricane about 215 miles (345 km) south-southwest of Kingston.

October 25
00:00 UTC (8:00 p.m. EDT, October 24)Hurricane Mitch strengthens into a Category 3 hurricane.
12:00 UTC (7:00 a.m. EST)Hurricane Mitch strengthens into a Category 4 hurricane.

October 26
12:00 UTC (7:00 a.m. EST)Hurricane Mitch strengthens into a Category 5 hurricane.
18:00 UTC (1:00 p.m.

October 28
06:00 UTC (1:00 a.m. EST)Hurricane Mitch weakens to a Category 4 hurricane very near the island of Guanaja and about 35 miles (55 km) north of the coast of mainland Honduras.
12:00 UTC (7:00 a.m. EST)Hurricane Mitch weakens to a Category 3 hurricane while meandering east-southeast of Guanaja.

October 29
00:00 UTC (7:00 p.m.
06:00 UTC (1:00 a.m. EST)Hurricane Mitch weakens to a Category 1 hurricane while remaining virtually stationary east of Roatán.
12:00 UTC (7:00 a.m.
18:00 UTC (1:00 p.m. EST) Hurricane Mitch weakens to a tropical storm along the coast near Limón.

October 31
15:00 UTC (9:00 a.m.

November

November 1
21:00 UTC (3:00 p.m. CST, November 1)Tropical Depression Mitch dissipates into an area of low pressure near Tapachula, Chiapas along the Guatemala–Mexico border.

November 3
18:00 UTC (12:00 p.m. CST) The area of low pressure re-generatee into Tropical Storm Mitch after emerging into the Bay of Campeche.

November 4
02:00 UTC (8:00 p.m.
06:00 UTC (12:00 a.m. CST)Tropical Storm Mitch weakens to a tropical depression over the Yucatán Peninsula.
12:00 UTC (6:00 a.m. CST)Tropical Depression Mitch re-strengthens into a tropical storm after emerging into the Gulf of Mexico.

November 5
11:00 UTC (6:00 a.m.
15:00 UTC (10:00 a.m. EST)Tropical Storm Mitch nears the east coast of Florida just north of Jupiter.
18:00 UTC (1:00 p.m.

November 24
00:00 UTC (8:00 p.m. AST, November 23)Tropical Depression Fourteen develops from a strong frontal low pressure area near the Canary Islands.
06:00 UTC (2:00 a.m. AST)Tropical Depression Fourteen strengthens into Tropical Storm Nicole.

November 26
09:00 UTC (5:00 a.m.

November 27
18:00 UTC (2:00 p.m.

November 30
 00:00 UTC (8:00 p.m. AST, November 29)Tropical Storm Nicole strengthens into a Category 1 hurricane southwest of the Azores.

 The 1998 Atlantic hurricane season officially ends.

December

December 1
 00:00 UTC (8:00 p.m.
 12:00 UTC (8:00 a.m. AST)Hurricane Nicole weakens to a tropical storm.
 18:00 UTC (2:00 p.m. AST)Tropical Storm Nicole transitions into an extratropical cyclone northwest of the Azores.

See also

 Lists of Atlantic hurricanes

Notes

References

Further reading

External links

 1998 Tropical Cyclone Advisory Archive, National Hurricane Center and Central Pacific Hurricane Center

1998 Atlantic hurricane season
1998 Atlantic hurricane season
Articles which contain graphical timelines